Hendrikus "Driekske" van Bussel (18 November 1868 – 27 April 1951) was an archer from the Netherlands. He was born in Asten, North Brabant and died in Helmond, North Brabant.

He represented his native country at the 1920 Summer Olympics in Antwerp, Belgium. There he won the gold medal in the Men's Team Event (28 m), alongside Joep Packbiers, Janus Theeuwes, Theo Willems, Jo van Gastel, Tiest van Gestel, Janus van Merrienboer, and Piet de Brouwer.

References

External links
 profile
 Dutch Olympic Committee 

1868 births
1951 deaths
Dutch male archers
Archers at the 1920 Summer Olympics
Olympic archers of the Netherlands
Olympic gold medalists for the Netherlands
People from Asten, Netherlands
Olympic medalists in archery
Medalists at the 1920 Summer Olympics
Sportspeople from North Brabant